Kumkiejmy  is a village in the administrative district of Gmina Górowo Iławeckie, within Bartoszyce County, Warmian-Masurian Voivodeship, in northern Poland, close to the border with the Kaliningrad Oblast of Russia.

Population 

1933: 356
1939: 389

References

Kumkiejmy